Mount Fyfe is a mountain,  high, standing  north of the Quest Cliffs in the Geologists Range, Antarctica. It was seen by the northern party of the New Zealand Geological Survey Antarctic Expedition (1961–62) and named for H.E. Fyfe, chief geologist of the New Zealand Geological Survey.

References

Mountains of Oates Land